After Dark (1976–2018) was a Swedish drag act starring entertainer Christer Lindarw who eventually also began appearing intermittently out of drag and singing with his own voice.

Show history
The group was put together for a special Stockholm nightclub called After Dark Club immediately after Lindarw with Roger Jönsson had appeared in Wild Side Story at Alexandra's in January 1976 and also in February, with an added co-star Lars "Lasse" Flinckman. Its immediate appeal with Alexandra's clientele has been cited as instrumental to rapid and early success. 
Since that time, After Dark has been a major ingredient in Swedish LGBT culture. Jönsson however left the group for another in 1981 and died in 1984. The Lindarw-Flinckman duo had international success, performing in Barcelona, Madrid and San Francisco.

By 2009 Flinckman had retired from the show (he died in 2016) and was replaced for a tour of Sweden by entertainer Lars-Åke Wilhelmsson also known as Babsan. Their Stockholm version of the show was broadcast by TV4 (Sweden) on New Year's Eve 2011. Dancer Nils-Albert Eriksson remained in the ensemble since its start in 1976 doing male parts.

Late in 2016, as his comprehensive biography was published by Bonniers, Lindarw starring alone began his last big show tour, to be completed at Oscarsteatern in Stockholm during the last few months of 2017, and he then revealed that After Dark would be discontinued after that.

Eurovision Song Contest attempts
In 2004 After Dark competed in Melodifestivalen, the annual Swedish preparation for the Eurovision Song Contest. Their song La dolce vita finished third domestically and did not proceed. A single of the song was a hit on the radio in Sweden and was often played at Swedish day care centers. After Dark did a new show that year, named for the song, at Stockholm's main amusement park.

In a fourth and final televised Melodifestivalen trial in February 2007 After Dark, without Flinckman, did (Åh) När ni tar saken i egna händer, which competed well but did not proceed to the domestic finale. The Swedish lyrics could all be interpreted as relating humorously to masturbation, its repeated title sounding as sung like "onanism, what you have at hand". Four people named as masturbators in it (by their first names only) are recognizable Swedish TV celebrities who according to Aftonbladet gave their consent. The number was performed "elegantly, intelligently and with style" and could alternatively be interpreted as dealing with home improvement.

After Dark was in Melodifestivalen 2016 with the song "Kom ut som en stjärna" and finished in 7th place in the third semifinal.

Singles

References

External links
 Official website

Swedish drag queens
Swedish musical groups
Swedish-language singers
LGBT-themed musical groups
Musical groups established in 1976
1976 establishments in Sweden
Drag groups
Melodifestivalen contestants of 2016
Melodifestivalen contestants of 2007
Melodifestivalen contestants of 2006
Melodifestivalen contestants of 2004